

1910s

External links

 Armenian film at the Internet Movie Database

1898
Lists of 1910s films
Films